Luís Antônio is a municipality in the state of São Paulo in Brazil. The population is 15,292 (2020 est.) in an area of 598 km². The elevation is 675 m.

The municipality contains the  Jataí Ecological Station, created in 1982.

References

Municipalities in São Paulo (state)